Jan Kostrhun (3 July 1942 – 2 May 2022) was a Czech politician. A member of the Czech Social Democratic Party, he served in the Chamber of Deputies from 1996 to 2002. He died on 2 May 2022 at the age of 79.

References

1942 births
2022 deaths
Czech male writers
20th-century Czech politicians
21st-century Czech politicians
Members of the Chamber of the Nations of Czechoslovakia (1992)
Members of the Chamber of Deputies of the Czech Republic (1996–1998)
Members of the Chamber of Deputies of the Czech Republic (1998–2002)
Communist Party of Czechoslovakia politicians
Czech Social Democratic Party politicians
Mendel University Brno alumni
People from Břeclav District